Dave Dunn (born October 15, 1965) is an American football coach and former player. He is the head football coach at Christopher Columbus High School in Westchester, Florida. Dunn served as the head football coach at Becker College in 2005 and the Catholic University of America from 2006 to 2015.

Playing Career
Dunn played college football at the University of San Diego and was team captain his junior and senior years, all conference and team MVP while playing defensive line.
Dunn signed and played professionally in 1991-1992 for the Graz Giants in the Austrian Football League. The Giants won the Austrian Bowl league championship and were 16-4 during his the two seasons.

Coaching career
Dunn began his college coaching career in 1990 at his alma mater, the University of San Diego, as defensive line coach. Afterwards, he moved to Indiana State University as outside linebackers coach. He then went to Harvard University, where he was the defensive line and strength coach. After Harvard, he moved to Florida Atlantic University as the running backs and special teams coach.

His first job as head coach came in 2005, as he signed for Becker College. The following season, 2006, he was named head coach at the Catholic University of America. On may, 2016, he announced that he was stepping down from the position and moving on to Marshall University as an assistant coach.

Head coaching record

College

References

External links
 Catholic University profile

1965 births
Living people
American football defensive linemen
Becker Hawks football coaches
Catholic University Cardinals football coaches
Colby Mules football coaches
Florida Atlantic Owls football coaches
Harvard Crimson football coaches
Indiana State Sycamores football coaches
Marshall Thundering Herd football coaches
San Diego Toreros football coaches
San Diego Toreros football players
High school football coaches in Florida
Sportspeople from Detroit
People from Monroe, Connecticut
Players of American football from Connecticut
American expatriate players of American football
American expatriate sportspeople in Austria